The Man I Married (alternative title I Married a Nazi) is an American 1940 drama film starring Joan Bennett, Francis Lederer, Lloyd Nolan and Anna Sten.

Plot
A successful, and yet naive American woman, art critic Carol Cabbott (Joan Bennett), is married to German Eric Hoffman (Francis Lederer). They have a seven-year-old son, Ricky (Johnny Russell). They travel to pre-war Nazi Germany to visit Eric's father, whom he has not seen for ten years, although everybody tells them that going to Nazi Germany is foolish. A friend, Dr. Hugo Gerhardt (Ludwig Stossel), asks them to deliver money to, and somehow help his brother, the famous philosopher Ernst Gerhardt, who has been arrested and imprisoned in a concentration camp (Dachau).

When the Hoffmans reach Berlin, they are met at the station not by Eric's father but by Eric's old schoolmate, Frieda (Anna Sten). Eric's father, an elderly director and owner of a factory, tells them he wants to sell everything and leave Berlin, as he can no longer stand the hostile atmosphere. Even his butler is a Nazi, and Frieda is always around Eric as the plot progresses. An active and enthusiastic Nazi, Frieda drags Eric to Nazi Party gatherings until he no longer wants to return to America, but wants to keep the factory and remain in Nazi Germany. His wife, Carol, however, feels uneasy about staying there, and as time passes she recognizes her husband less and less.
 
While he goes to Nazi gatherings, she tries to find out something about Gerhardt, with the help of Kenneth Delane (Lloyd Nolan), an American foreign correspondent in Berlin who has a prophetic understanding of the demise of Nazi Germany. They find out Gerhardt has been killed in Dachau, so Carol gives the money to Gerhardt’s widow. They witness scenes of deliberate cruel denigration of people by Nazis in the streets, and Carol begins to awaken to the true situation of Germany under Nazi control.

Carol suspects Eric of infidelity with Frieda, and Eric admits to Carol that he wants to marry Frieda. Carol reluctantly agrees, but they quarrel over custody of their son. Eric refuses to allow Carol to leave Germany with his son, Ricky, whom he wishes to raise in the Nazi Party. Finally, Eric's father warns Eric that if he does not let Ricky return with Carol to the United States, he will go to the police and tell them that Eric's mother was a Jewess. Eric is devastated to learn of his heritage, and Frieda, who witnessed the interaction, is disgusted by this revelation of Eric's parentage and leaves the house exclaiming that he is a “Jude." Carol and Ricky leave for New York. Delane, who had hoped to get a leave to go back home, takes them to the station and tells Carol he has to stay "for the duration.”

Cast
Joan Bennett as Carol Hoffman
Francis Lederer as Eric Hoffman
Lloyd Nolan as Kenneth Delane
Anna Sten as Frieda
Otto Kruger as Heinrich Hoffman
Maria Ouspenskaya as Frau Gerhardt
Ludwig Stossel as Dr. Hugo Gerhardt
Johnny Russell as Ricky
Lionel Royce as Herr Deckhart
Fredrik Vogeding as Traveler
Ernst Deutsch as Otto
Egon Brecher asa Czech
William Kaufman as Conductor
Frank Reicher as Friehof

Reception
While the film received mostly positive reviews, Bennett's performance was the exception. In 1940, New York Times reviewer Bosley Crowther called the "anti-Nazi propaganda film" "restrained", "frank and factual" and "generally entertaining cinematically". He singled out Lederer's performance for praise, but of Bennett he wrote, "she does little more than model dresses and express incredulity."

References

External links

1940 films
1940 drama films
American black-and-white films
American drama films
American propaganda films
Anti-fascist works
Films about Nazi Germany
Films based on short fiction
Films directed by Irving Pichel
Films produced by Darryl F. Zanuck
Films set in Berlin
20th Century Fox films
1940s American films